
Gmina Wielgomłyny is a rural gmina (administrative district) in Radomsko County, Łódź Voivodeship, in central Poland.

The gmina contains part of the protected area called Przedbórz Landscape Park.

Villages
Gmina Wielgomłyny contains the villages and settlements of Anielin, Błonie, Bogusławów, Borecznica, Borowiec, Dębowiec, Goszczowa, Grabowie, Karczów, Kruszyna, Krzętów, Kubiki, Maksymów, Myśliwczów, Myśliwczów-Kolonia, Niedośpielin, Niwa Goszczowska, Niwa Zagórska, Odrowąż, Popielarnia, Pratkowice, Rogi, Rudka, Sokola Góra, Sroków, Trzebce, Trzebce-Perzyny, Wielgomłyny, Wielgomłyny-Kolonia, Wola Kuźniewska, Wola Życińska, Wólka Bankowa, Wólka Włościańska, Zacisze, Zagórze, Zalesie and Zawodzie.

Neighbouring gminas
Gmina Wielgomłyny is bordered by the gminas of Kluczewsko, Kobiele Wielkie, Masłowice, Przedbórz and Żytno.

References
 Polish official population figures 2006

Wielgomlyny
Radomsko County